Lake McDonald is an unincorporated community in Flathead County, Montana, United States. The community is located on the northeastern shore of Lake McDonald in Glacier National Park.

Prior to 1878, the lake was known as Terry Lake, after Gen. Alfred Terry. The National Park Service formalized the name of Lake McDonald.

References

Unincorporated communities in Flathead County, Montana
Unincorporated communities in Montana
Glacier National Park (U.S.)